The General Electric F101 is an afterburning turbofan jet engine. It powers the Rockwell B-1 Lancer strategic bomber fleet of the USAF. The F101 was GE's first turbofan with an afterburner.

Development
The F101 was developed specifically for the Advanced Manned Strategic Aircraft, which became the B-1A. The F101 powered the four development aircraft from 1970 to 1981. The B-1A was officially cancelled in 1977. However the flight test program continued. General Electric was awarded a contract to further develop the F101-102 engine variant. This turbofan eventually powered the B-1B from 1984, entering service in 1986. The B-1's four F101 engines helped the aircraft win 61 world records for speed, payload and range.

The GE F110 fighter engine is a derivative of the F101, designed using data from the F101-powered variant of the F-16 Fighting Falcon tested in the early 1980s. The F101 also became the basis for the highly successful CFM56 series of civil turbofans.

Applications
 Rockwell B-1 Lancer

Specifications (F101-GE-102)

See also

References

External links

F101 on GE Aviation's site
F101 page on GlobalSecurity.org

Low-bypass turbofan engines
F101
1970s turbofan engines